VSSC may refer to:

 Vikram Sarabhai Space Centre, a major space research centre of the Indian Space Research Organisation
 VSSC Central School, a school associated with the Vikram Sarabhai Space Centre
 Voltage-Gated Sodium Channels
 Vedanta Society of Southern California, a branch of the Ramakrishna Math